"Just Friends (Sunny)" is the first single from Musiq Soulchild's debut album Aijuswanaseing. It was released on August 29, 2000 as a 12" single. The song was written for and also included on the soundtrack to the 2000 film Nutty Professor II: The Klumps.

It debuted on the Billboard Hot R&B/Hip-Hop Songs chart on September 9, 2000, spent 37 weeks on the chart (its last being May 19, 2001), and peaked at #6.

"Just Friends (Sunny)" entered the Billboard Hot 100 on October 14, 2000, spending 19 weeks there, peaking at #31 and falling off on February 24, 2001.

Prince recorded a version of "Just Friends (Sunny)" for his 2002 live album, One Nite Alone... Live!.

Drum & Bass artist Dave Owen sampled "Just Friends (Sunny)" for his tune "Loose Lips", released in 2012.

References 

1999 songs
2000 debut singles
Musiq Soulchild songs
Prince (musician) songs
Music videos directed by Marcus Raboy
Songs written by Carvin Haggins
Songs written by Musiq Soulchild